Four ships of the Royal Navy have borne the name HMS Thisbe, after Thisbe, a character in Greek mythology:

  was a 28-gun  sixth-rate frigate launched in 1783 and sold in 1815.
  was a 46-gun fifth rate launched in 1824, lent as a church ship in 1863, and sold in 1892.
  was an  launched in 1943 and scrapped in 1957.

Royal Navy ship names